A miser is a person who hoards money

Miser may also refer to:

Arts and entertainment
 The Miser, a 1668 play by Molière
 The Miser (Fielding play), a 1733 work by Henry Fielding based on Molière's play
 L'avaro (Anfossi) (Italian for "The Miser"), a 1775 opera composed by Pasquale Anfossi with a libretto based on Molière's play
 The Miser, a comic opera (1782?) by Vasily Pashkevich based on Molière's play
 The Miser (1908 film), a French short silent film
 L'Avare (film), a 1980 French comedy film with the English title The Miser
 Kanjan (English: Miser), a 1947 Indian film
 The Miser (1990 film), an Italian comedy film
 Φάσμα ἢ Φιλάργυρος (The Miser), one of three surviving titles of works by Theognetus, an Ancient Greek comic poet
 The Miser, a 1979 TV programme - see List of television programmes produced by BBC Scotland

Other uses
 Pete Miser, stage name of Peter Ho (born 1971), an Asian-American hip-hop rapper and producer
 Miser, a special model of the Dodge Omni subcompact car
 Miser Mine - see List of mines in Oregon
 Snow Miser and Heat Miser, two characters from the 1974 television special The Year Without a Santa Claus

See also
 
 
 List of people known as the Miser
 MISER algorithm, used in numerical integration
 Misère (French for "poverty"), a bid in card games